Adriaan van Maanen (March 31, 1884 – January 26, 1946) was a Dutch–American astronomer.

Van Maanen, born into a well-to-do family in Friesland, studied astronomy at the University of Utrecht (earning his Ph.D. in 1911) and worked briefly at the University of Groningen. In 1911, he came to the United States to work as a volunteer in an unpaid capacity at Yerkes Observatory. Within a year he got a position at the Mount Wilson Observatory, where he remained active until his death in 1946.

He discovered Van Maanen's star.

He is well known for his astrometric measurements of internal motions in spiral nebulae. Believing that nebulae were local, stellar and gaseous systems that existed in our galaxy, his measurements came to be at odds with Edwin Hubble's discovery that the Andromeda Nebula and other spiral nebulae were extragalactic objects. The speed of rotation he calculated for the nebulae, if Hubble were correct as to their extragalactic nature, would have had their Cepheid stars moving at speeds faster than that of light. In 1935, it was decided that since Hubble's calculations of extragalactic Cepheid distances were correct, ergo van Maanen's astrometric measurements had to be incorrect.

In 1924 he became member of the Royal Netherlands Academy of Arts and Sciences.

Known for faulty results
In the first and second decade of the 20th century there was a large controversy in the astronomical world about the size of the Milky Way, the size of the universe and the nature of spiral galaxies. The result of this controversy was the great debate in Washington DC between Harlow Shapley and Heber Doust Curtis in April 1920. Shapley believed that spiral galaxies weren't systems equal to the Milky Way and in one of his arguments he used the results of Van Maanen, who measured the rotation of the spiral arms of spiral galaxies. After extrapolating his results he concluded that motion of the arms of spiral galaxies had a period of 105 years. While Curtis had stated that spiral galaxies were similar to the Milky Way and thus had to have a similar size, believed to be 5 kiloparsecs (kpc) at that time, the period of the motion was far too small for a radius of 2.5 kpc. At that period and radius, it would mean that the spiral arms rotated with a speed greater than the speed of light. Curtis agreed that if the results of van Maanen were correct, Shapley was right. But Curtis rejected the results of van Maanen due to unrealistic accuracy claimed by him. Later astronomers have re-examined the measurements of Van Maanen, and concluded he had made a serious error.

The origin of van Maanen's measurement errors emerged from his stereo blink comparator, which van Maanen used to compare new plates with plates some 10–20 years old. By blinking between those two plates he could detect small discrepancies on the positions of the objects. His reference objects were the field stars fairly near the edge of the plates. However he didn't consider that due to optical effects these stars had been smeared out a little towards the edges, slightly differently between the two plates. This caused systematic errors resulting in imaginary movements.

Another possible explanation is that van Maanen simply saw what he had been trained to see for years: that the "spiral nebulae" were relatively nearby and therefore ought to have a quite detectable rotation. This belief was quite widespread in the early 20th-century and therefore very hard to ignore. This does not, however, explain supposedly corroborating findings from Mount Wilson, Lowell Observatory, Russia, and the Netherlands.

References
Notes

Further reading

External links 
Angular Rotations of Spiral Nebulae, Hubble, E., ApJ, 81, 334 (1935) – NADS
Internal Motions in Spiral Nebulae, Van Maanen, A., ApJ, 81, 336 (1935) – NADS
Adriaan van Maanen and internal motions in spiral nebulae: A historical review, Quarterly Journal of the Royal Astronomical Society, Vol. 13, 1972
Adriaan van Maanen on the significance of Internal Motions in Spiral Nebulae, Hetherington, N.S., J Hist Astron, 5. 52 (1974) – NADS
On Spiral Nebulae, van Maanen et al. Chronological bibliography of articles on astrometrical measurements of spiral nebulae.

1884 births
1946 deaths
20th-century American astronomers
American people of Frisian descent
20th-century Dutch astronomers
People from Sneek
Dutch emigrants to the United States
Members of the Royal Netherlands Academy of Arts and Sciences
Utrecht University alumni
Academic staff of the University of Groningen